Ghafoer Luckan (born 18 December 1985) is a former South African rugby union player, currently a strength and conditioning coach with the Springbok 7's team. His regular playing position was winger.

Career

Youth
He was included in the senior squads for the 2006 Vodacom Cup, 2007 Vodacom Cup and 2007 Currie Cup Premier Division seasons, but failed to make an appearance in any of those competitions.

Border Bulldogs
He made eleven appearances in total, scoring three tries.

Leopards and NWU Pukke

Western Province

SWD Eagles
A further five appearances followed in the 2013 Vodacom Cup, as well as six in the 2013 Currie Cup Premier Division.

References

South African rugby union players
Living people
1985 births
Sportspeople from Cape Town
Western Province (rugby union) players
Leopards (rugby union) players
Border Bulldogs players
SWD Eagles players
Rugby union strength and conditioning coaches